Patrick Falk (born 8 February 1980) is a German football manager and former player. He made his debut on the professional league level in the Bundesliga for Eintracht Frankfurt on 14 August 1999 when he came on as a substitute in the 67th minute in a game against SpVgg Unterhaching.

References

External links
 
 
 

1980 births
Living people
German footballers
Association football midfielders
Germany youth international footballers
Bundesliga players
2. Bundesliga players
Regionalliga players
Bayer 04 Leverkusen II players
Eintracht Frankfurt players
Eintracht Frankfurt II players
Eintracht Braunschweig players
Rot-Weiß Oberhausen players
Kickers Offenbach players
FC Sachsen Leipzig players
Footballers from Frankfurt